Jugurtha Domrane (Arabic: يوغرطة دومران; born 13 July 1989 in France) is a French retired footballer.

Career

After failing to make an appearance for French Ligue 1 clubs Le Mans and Lille OSC, Domrane signed for Royal Excel Mouscron in the Belgian second division, due to Lille OSC owning the team. Later, he regretted leaving Lille OSC, saying that he "should have waited for my chance".

For the second half of 2014/15, Domrane signed for MO Béjaïa, helping them win that season's Algerian Cup.

In 2015, he returned to Belgium with R.W.S. Bruxelles amid offers from Tunisia and France.

During 2018/19, at the age of 29, he played for French sixth division side AS Saint-Ouen-l'Aumône before leaving for Saint-Brice in the same league because of financial disagreements.

References

External links
 Jugurtha Domrane at Footballdatabase.eu

Association football defenders
Living people
French footballers
1989 births
Royal Excel Mouscron players
RWS Bruxelles players
USM Bel Abbès players
MO Béjaïa players